Amy Livesey (born 31 December 1993) is a British judoka.

Judo career
She is the bronze medallist of the 2017 Judo Grand Slam Ekaterinburg in the -63 kg category. She became champion of Great Britain, winning the half-middleweight division at the British Judo Championships in 2018.

Personal history
Amy Livesey has a sister named Bekky Livesey, who has won British championships at half-middleweight and a brother Owen Livesey, who is a three-times British champion at half-middleweight.

References

External links
 

1993 births
Living people
British female judoka